Heemskerk railway station is located in Heemskerk, Netherlands. The station opened 1 June 1969 on the Haarlem–Uitgeest railway. The station has 2 platforms.

Train services
, the following services call at Heemskerk:
2× per hour local service (sprinter) Hoorn - Alkmaar - Uitgeest - Haarlem - Amsterdam

External links
NS website 
Dutch public transport travel planner 

Railway stations in North Holland
Railway stations opened in 1969
Heemskerk